Christel House Academy is a network of learning centers supported by Christel House International (CHI). The centers, authorized by the Mayor of Indianapolis, operate as public charter schools on multiple campus locations.

Christel House Academy South opened in 2002 on the Southside of Indianapolis and serves more than 600 low income students in grades K–12.

Christel House DORS South, an adult dropout recovery high school, is located on the Christel House South campus. Christel House DORS West, the Academy's second adult high school, opened on the Christel House West campus in 2015.

In December 2013 Christel House Academy received an F-rating in Indiana state school accountability rankings.

In subsequent years, Christel House Academy South earned a B.

References

External links
Christel House Academy (South)
Christel House DORS

Public elementary schools in Indiana
Public middle schools in Indiana
Public high schools in Indiana
Schools in Indianapolis
Charter schools in Indiana
2002 establishments in Indiana